A corkscrew is a tool for drawing stopping corks from bottles.

Corkscrew may also refer to:

Fictional entities
 Corkscrew (comics), a mutant in Marvel Comics' X-Statix
 Corkscrew, a robot on Robot Wars

Roller coasters 
Corkscrew (roller coaster element), a type of roller coaster inversion
Corkscrew (Alton Towers), a defunct roller coaster at Alton Towers in the United Kingdom
Corkscrew (Cedar Point), at Cedar Point in Sandusky, Ohio, United States
Corkscrew (Michigan's Adventure), at Michigan's Adventure in Muskegon, Michigan, United States
Corkscrew (Playland), at Playland in Vancouver, British Columbia, Canada
Corkscrew (Silverwood), at Silverwood, Athol, Idaho, United States
Corkscrew (Valleyfair), at Valleyfair in Shakopee, Minnesota, United States
Canobie Corkscrew, at Canobie Lake Park in Salem, New Hampshire, United States
Sea Viper (roller coaster), formerly known as Corkscrew at Sea World, Australia

Sports
 Corkscrew, a professional wrestling aerial technique
Korketrekkeren ("The Corkscrew"), a former Olympic bobsled track in Oslo, Norway
 "The Corkscrew", a turn on WeatherTech Raceway Laguna Seca, a racetrack near Monterey, California

Other uses
 Corkscrew (program), SSH over HTTPS
 Corkscrew esophagus, an appearance of Diffuse esophageal spasm
 Corkscrew landing, in aviation
 Corkscrew Swamp Sanctuary, a tree and bird sanctuary in Florid
 Genlisea, the corkscrew plant
 Operation Corkscrew, Allied invasion of Sicily in World War II

See also 
Bottle opener, a device that enables the removal of metal bottle caps from bottles
Helix, a twisted shape like a spring, screw, or spiral staircase
Tube curls, a ringlet hairstyle resembling a corkscrew
Water slide, a type of slide designed for warm-weather or indoor recreational use at water parks